Lasiopetaleae is a tribe of the subfamily Byttnerioideae of the flowering plant family Malvaceae.

References

Byttnerioideae
Rosid tribes